Otgonbayar Oyunbaatar (born 9 April 1993) is a Mongolian footballer who plays for Ulaanbaatar City FC of the Mongolian Premier League, and the Mongolian national team.

Club career
Oyunbaatar has played for Khoromkhon FC of the Mongolian Premier League. In 2015 he was part of Khoromkhon's squad for the 2016 AFC Cup qualifying round, taking part in the team's matches against K-Electric F.C. of Pakistan and Druk United of Bhutan. In 2016 he was named the league's best defender. He joined fellow Premier League club Ulaanbaatar City FC for the 2017 season. Following the season, he signed a 5-year contract extension with the club worth 10 million MNT plus living expenses per season.

International career
Oyunbaatar made his senior international debut on 30 June 2016 in a 2017 EAFF E-1 Football Championship match against Macau.

International career statistics

References

External links
MFF profile

1994 births
Living people
Mongolian footballers
Mongolia international footballers
Association football defenders
Khoromkhon players
Ulaanbaatar City FC players